The 1998 Western Athletic Conference Mustangs football team represented Southern Methodist University (SMU) as a member of the Mountain Division of the Western Athletic Conference (WAC) during 1998 NCAA Division I-A football season. Led by second-year head coach Mike Cavan, the Mustangs finished the season with an overall record of 5–7 and a mark of 4–4 in conference play, tying for fifth place in the WAC's Mountain Division. However, SMU vacated 10 games after Steve Malin was found to have been ineligible due to academic fraud. The Mustangs played their home games at the Cotton Bowl in Dallas.

Schedule

Personnel

Roster

After the season

NFL Draft

Two members of the 1998 SMU squad were selected in the 1999 NFL Draft. Defensive back Donald Mitchell was selected in the fourth round and 117th overall by the Tennessee Titans. Defensive back Coby Rhinehart was selected in the sixth round and 190th overall by the Arizona Cardinals.

Steve Malin controversy
Twelve years after the NCAA "death penalty" that caused the SMU football program to shut down for two years, SMU encountered another scandal. SMU notified the NCAA of possible recruiting violations in early August 1999 and subsequently suspended defensive line coach Steve Malin. On November 7, 1999, The Dallas Morning News reported that former SMU football player Corlin Donaldson alleged that Malin paid another person $100 to take Donaldson's ACT exam in 1998 so that Donaldson would be eligible to attend SMU. Although Donaldson described this account to NCAA investigators, Donaldson recanted this story under pressure from Malin to save Malin's job. Following an internal investigation, SMU fired Malin on December 8, 1999; Malin had been suspended that year since August 3 without a replacement at his position. Additionally, SMU removed one assistant coach from recruiting roles for the 2000 season, reduced a total of 8 scholarships for the 2000 and 2001 seasons, and reduced a total of 16 official campus visits for high school recruits for those seasons as well. SMU also submitted a report to the NCAA.

On December 13, 2000, the NCAA placed SMU on two years' probation and vacated ten games from SMU's 1998 season in which Donaldson played, which reduced SMU's record to 1-1 for 1998. SMU's 2005 media guide indicates that the NCAA vacated the first ten games of the 1998 season. The NCAA reported that its infractions committee "concluded that the assistant football coach [Malin] initially suggested that the prospective student-athlete [Donaldson] should participate in academic fraud, actively assisted in the initial fraudulent ACT, had actual knowledge of the fraud in the second ACT and finally, had reason to know that the prospect, after enrolling at the university and becoming a student-athlete, was ineligible to compete by reason of the academic fraud." Additionally, the NCAA also discovered rules violations regarding recruiting and tryouts dating back to 1995. The NCAA also extended SMU's self-imposed restrictions on coaches' off-campus recruiting to the 2001 season and limited official visits for high school recruits to 38 for the 2001–02 school year. Malin also was assessed a seven-year show-cause penalty.

References

External links
 1998 SMU stats at Sports-Reference.com

SMU
SMU Mustangs football seasons
SMU Mustangs football